Nourdin Boukhari (born 30 June 1980) is a Dutch-Moroccan former professional footballer who played as a midfielder. After retiring, he worked as a youth coach he is the currently assistant coach of Eredivisie club Sparta Rotterdam. Born in the Netherlands, he represented Morocco at international level.

Club career
He started his career for Sparta where he stood out for his technical skill and subsequently signed for Ajax where he made his debut against FC Groningen on 1 September 2002. For the 2003–04 season, he was loaned to NAC Breda. After his contract had expired in 2006, he joined French league side Nantes. However, his stay with the French side turned out to be a disappointment, so he was sent on loan to AZ in January 2007. Although not unsuccessful, AZ chose not to buy him and Boukhari returned to Nantes, which was relegated to the Ligue 2. Boukhari was reluctant to play in the second division and on 7 July he returned to Sparta Rotterdam, where he signed a contract for three years. Back at the club where it all started for him, Boukhari became club captain and the face of the 100-year Anniversary of the club.

After spending a season with Sparta Rotterdam, Boukhari was approached early in the transfer window by Saudi Arabian club Al-Ittihad. However, the Saudi Arabian side then refused to pay the transfer fee to Sparta, instead of paying the fee, sending a lawyer to declare that they wanted to cancel the deal. Al-Ittihad manager Gabriel Calderón was reportedly unhappy about Boukhari's lack of match fitness, and asked the board to cancel the transfer. However, the Eredivisie side wanted the transfer to go through: "The transfer is a done deal and we expect to receive the money into our account," said director Peter Bonthuis. The Rotterdam side submitted a complaint to FIFA regarding the Saudi Arabian club's sudden change of action.

In January 2009, Boukhari signed a contract until the end of the season with NAC Breda. In July 2009, he signed three-year deal with Turkish side Kasimpasa SK. He was sent on loan to Polish side Wisła Kraków for the 2010–11 season. After his contract with Kasimpasa had been dissolved, Boukhari signed an amateur deal with NAC Breda until the end of the season. After he had left as a free agent, he again signed an amateur deal with RKC Waalwijk in September 2012, which was turned into a paid deal in January 2013. However, he was released at the end of the season. In January 2014, he signed with Sparta Rotterdam, with which he almost promoted to the Eredivisie. He retired from professional football in June 2014 and became a member of the staff, being responsible for the team's strikers. He started playing for the freshly Hoofdklasse side Magreb '90.

International career
Boukhari chose to represent Morocco in international football. He made his international debut in a November 2001 friendly match against Zambia.

Honours
Ajax
KNVB Cup: 2005–06
Johan Cruyff Shield: 2002, 2005

Wisła Kraków
Ekstraklasa: 2010–11

Personal life
He is the step-father to Club Brugge and Netherlands youth international winger Noa Lang.

References

External links
 Voetbal International profile 
 
 

1980 births
Living people
Footballers from Rotterdam
Dutch sportspeople of Moroccan descent
Moroccan footballers
Morocco international footballers
Moroccan expatriate footballers
Sparta Rotterdam players
AFC Ajax players
NAC Breda players
FC Nantes players
AZ Alkmaar players
Kasımpaşa S.K. footballers
Wisła Kraków players
Eredivisie players
Eerste Divisie players
Derde Divisie players
Ligue 1 players
Süper Lig players
Ittihad FC players
Expatriate footballers in France
Expatriate footballers in Turkey
Ekstraklasa players
Expatriate footballers in Poland
Moroccan expatriate sportspeople in Poland
2002 African Cup of Nations players
Association football wingers
Association football midfielders
Magreb '90 players
Saudi Professional League players